International School of Uganda (ISU) is an international school in Kampala, Uganda. It serves students ages 3 through 19.

The school was established in 1967.

Student body
The student body is multicultural with 550 students from about 60 countries.

References

External links

 International School of Uganda

Educational institutions established in 1967
Schools in Kampala
International schools in Uganda
1967 establishments in Uganda